Hosmer is a city in northwestern Edmunds County, South Dakota, United States. The population was 164 at the 2020 census.

History
Hosmer was laid out in 1887. The name for the town of Hosmer came from a railroad agent's wife's maiden name, Stella A. Hosmer.

Geography

Hosmer has been assigned the ZIP code 57448 and the FIPS place code 30140.

Demographics

2010 census
As of the census of 2010, there were 208 people, 100 households, and 48 families residing in the city. The racial makeup of the city was 98.1% White, 0.5% Asian, and 1.4% from two or more races.

There were 100 households, of which 12.0% had children under the age of 18 living with them, 41.0% were married couples living together, 5.0% had a female householder with no husband present, 2.0% had a male householder with no wife present, and 52.0% were non-families. 48.0% of all households were made up of individuals, and 20% had someone living alone who was 65 years of age or older. The average household size was 1.81 and the average family size was 2.58.

The median age in the city was 57 years. 10.6% of residents were under the age of 18; 4.3% were between the ages of 18 and 24; 13% were from 25 to 44; 33.2% were from 45 to 64; and 38.9% were 65 years of age or older. The gender makeup of the city was 50.5% male and 49.5% female.

2000 census
As of the census of 2000, there were 287 people, 115 households, and 67 families residing in the city. The population density was 288.2 people per square mile (110.8/km2). There were 162 housing units at an average density of 162.7 per square mile (62.5/km2). The racial makeup of the city was 98.95% White, 0.35% Asian, and 0.70% from two or more races. Hispanic or Latino of any race were 1.39% of the population.

There were 115 households, out of which 23.5% had children under the age of 18 living with them, 48.7% were married couples living together, 8.7% had a female householder with no husband present, and 41.7% were non-families. 37.4% of all households were made up of individuals, and 24.3% had someone living alone who was 65 years of age or older. The average household size was 2.20 and the average family size was 2.96.

In the city, the population was spread out, with 22.0% under the age of 18, 3.5% from 18 to 24, 17.8% from 25 to 44, 19.5% from 45 to 64, and 37.3% who were 65 years of age or older. The median age was 50 years. For every 100 females, there were 75.0 males. For every 100 females age 18 and over, there were 75.0 males.

The median income for a household in the city was $26,667, and the median income for a family was $37,813. Males had a median income of $23,438 versus $15,781 for females. The per capita income for the city was $13,952. None of the families and 8.3% of the population were living below the poverty line, including no under eighteens and 19.0% of those over 64.

Schools
Hosmer was home to the Hosmer Tigers until the end of the 1990–1991 school year, when they combined with the Roscoe Hornets of Roscoe, South Dakota, to make Edmunds Central, home of the Raiders. The Hosmer school was then used for some of the Edmunds Central elementary classes. The school in Hosmer is now closed. Due to the state's open enrollment policy, parents may choose to send their children where they wish, although most primary and secondary students living in the Hosmer school district have continued attending Edmunds Central in Roscoe.

Tourism

Hosmer sees little tourism throughout the majority of the year; however, because the surrounding area is home to an abundant population of pheasant, throughout the fall season the town does see an influx of people who arrive from all areas of the country for the pheasant hunting season. The increase in traffic brings business to the local grocery, gas station, bar, and café. Many visitors stay with families within or near the town, bringing excitement and company to the residents. A well-maintained city park offers tourist families a place to play tennis on a provided court, allow children to play on playground equipment, and relax under a large shelter. Outside of town is the Hosmer State Public Shooting Area and a park for baseball

See also
 List of cities in South Dakota

References

External links

 Hosmer SD, Centennial Book, 1887–1987

Cities in South Dakota
Cities in Edmunds County, South Dakota
Aberdeen, South Dakota micropolitan area
German-Russian culture in South Dakota
German communities in the United States
Populated places established in 1887
1887 establishments in Dakota Territory